Ulysha Reneé Hall (born February 10, 1971) is an American police officer. She served as the chief of police of the Dallas Police Department from 2017 through the end of 2020.

Hall grew up in Detroit. Her father was a police officer with the Detroit Police Department, but was murdered in 1971 when she was six months old. She attended Grambling State University and University of Detroit Mercy, and became an officer with the Detroit Police Department herself. She was promoted to deputy chief of the Detroit police in 2014. The Detroit City Council noted in 2017 that "Deputy Chief Ulysha Renee Hall has served the Detroit Police Department and the citizens of Detroit with loyalty, integrity and professionalism. She is widely respected throughout the law enforcement community as a disciplined leader and consummate professional with the proven ability to deliver results."  In 2017, she moved to Dallas to become chief of the Dallas Police Department. She became the first woman (and first black woman) to serve as police chief in Dallas. On September 8, 2020, Hall sent her letter of resignation to the Dallas city manager, which was accepted. However, Hall's resignation did not go into effect until the end of 2020.

Appointments
Major Cities Chiefs-Police Executive Leadership Institute (PELI IV) September 2016 to March 2017

Graduate of the FBI National Academy Session #262 October 5, 2015 through December 11, 2015

Gubernatorial Appointment to The State of Michigan Elevator Safety Board 2014 & 2016
Governor Rick Snyder 

In 2022, Hall was named a fellow of Harvard University's Advanced Leadership Initiative.

Honors

2015 Honoree for Women of Excellence
Michigan Chronicle

2017 Woman of the Decade
Native Detroiter

Congressional Badge of Bravery Board Member (CBOB)

References

External links
Reneé Hall - Official website
Reneé Hall Chief of Police - Dallas Police Department Biography

1971 births
Living people
African-American police officers
American women police officers
Detroit Police Department officers
Chiefs of the Dallas Police Department
Grambling State University alumni
University of Detroit Mercy alumni
Women in law enforcement
21st-century African-American people
20th-century African-American people
20th-century African-American women
21st-century African-American women